Bromodifluoroacetyl chloride is a chemical compound with the formula BrCF2COCl.  It has been used as a starting material for the synthesis of (biologically active) α,α-difluoro-γ-lactams and has been used in the synthesis of trifluoromethylated C-nucleosides.

See also
Acetyl chloride
Trifluoroacetic acid

References

Acyl chlorides
Organochlorides
Organofluorides
Organobromides